Two ships of the Japanese Navy have been named Arare:

 , a  launched in 1905 and broken up in 1924.
 , an  launched in 1937 and sunk in 1942.

Imperial Japanese Navy ship names
Japanese Navy ship names